Indolestes obiri is a species of damselfly in the family Lestidae,
commonly known as a cave reedling. 
It is endemic to Arnhem Land, in Northern Territory, Australia, where it inhabits shallow, rocky pools.

Indolestes obiri is a medium-sized, dull-coloured damselfly.

Gallery

See also
 List of Odonata species of Australia

References 

Lestidae
Odonata of Australia
Insects of Australia
Endemic fauna of Australia
Taxa named by J.A.L. (Tony) Watson
Insects described in 1979
Damselflies